The position of Under-Secretary of State for War was a British government position, first applied to Evan Nepean (appointed in 1794). In 1801 the offices for War and the Colonies were merged and the post became that of Under-Secretary of State for War and the Colonies.  The position was re-instated in 1854 and remained until 1947, when it was combined with that of Financial Secretary to the War Office. In 1964 the War Office, Admiralty and Air Ministry were merged to form the Ministry of Defence, and the post was abolished.

Parliamentary Under-Secretaries of State for War, 1794–1801

See Under-Secretary of State for War and the Colonies for the period 1801-1854.

Parliamentary Under-Secretaries of State for War, 1854–1947

In April 1947 the office was combined with that of Financial Secretary to the War Office.

Parliamentary Under-Secretaries of State for War and Financial Secretary to the War Office, 1947–1964

Office reorganised 1 April 1964

Permanent Under-Secretaries of State for War, 1854–1966

References

Defunct ministerial offices in the United Kingdom
1794 establishments in Great Britain
1801 disestablishments in the United Kingdom
1854 establishments in the United Kingdom
1964 disestablishments in the United Kingdom
War Office
War Office in World War II